New Antioch is an unincorporated community in Green Township, Clinton County, Ohio, United States.

History
New Antioch was platted in 1851. The community was named after the ancient city of Antioch. A post office called New Antioch was established in 1847, and remained in operation until 1907.

Gallery

References

Unincorporated communities in Clinton County, Ohio
Unincorporated communities in Ohio